The Palms may refer to:

Australia 

 The Palms, Queensland, a locality in the Gympie Region
 The Palms National Park, a small national park located between Cooyar and Yarraman in Queensland, Australia
 The Palms at Crown, a concert venue at the Crown Casino and Entertainment Complex in Melbourne, Australia

Canada 

 Ritz-Carlton Vancouver (formerly referred to as Palm Court and Vancouver's Turn), a planned skyscraper in Downtown Vancouver, British Columbia

New Zealand 

 The Palms Shopping Centre, a shopping mall located in the Christchurch, New Zealand suburb of Shirley

United Arab Emirates 

 The Palm Islands, an artificial archipelago in Dubai, United Arab Emirates

United States 

Palms, Los Angeles (originally "The Palms"), a community founded in 1886 in West Los Angeles, California
Palms Casino Resort, a casino hotel and residential tower located in Paradise, Nevada
Palms Apartments, an apartment building located at 1001 East Jefferson Avenue in Detroit, Michigan

See also
 Palm (disambiguation)